Jean Louise Stothert (née Wolf; born February 7, 1954) is an American politician and former nurse serving as the 51st mayor of Omaha, Nebraska. She is the first woman to hold the office and was sworn in as Mayor on June 10, 2013. She was re-elected on May 10, 2017, and May 11, 2021.

Personal life 
Jean Stothert was born on February 7, 1954, in Wood River, Illinois. She earned a Bachelor of Science in nursing from Seattle Pacific University.

Stothert married Joe Stothert in 1981. He became a critical care surgery specialist at the Nebraska Medical Center. The couple had two children, and were married until Joe Stothert died at age 72. 

In May, 2022 she married Dr. J. Kevin O'Rourke.  Dr. O'Rourke is a retired anesthesiologist who Stothert met when he was in medical school at St. Louis University and she was a critical care nurse at St. Louis University Hospital.

Career 
Stothert began her career in nursing. Her 12 years as a critical care nurse and nursing manager included serving as head nurse at St. Louis University in Missouri. She was responsible for her department budgeting, hiring and staff management.

Politics
In 1997, Stothert was elected to the Millard Board of Education. She was re-elected for three terms, including 3 years as president of the board, serving until 2009.

Entering politics after she and her husband moved to Omaha, Stothert was a candidate for the Nebraska Legislature in 2006. She was defeated by Steve Lathrop by 14 votes (5073–5059).

In 2009, Stothert was elected to the Omaha City Council (District 5), defeating Jon Blumenthal, 7401 to 4308.

Mayor of Omaha 
On June 29, 2012, Stothert announced her candidacy for Mayor of Omaha. Stothert raised $513,124 for campaign, compared to $804,700 raised by Jim Suttle. Stothert received 32.2% of votes in a primary election of April 2, 2013.

She was elected mayor with 57.32% of votes, on May 14, 2013, defeating the incumbent mayor Jim Suttle. She is the first woman to hold this office. Stothert was re-elected in 2017, and won a historic third term for Omaha Mayor in 2021.

See also
 List of mayors of the 50 largest cities in the United States

References

External links

1954 births
21st-century American politicians
21st-century American women politicians
Living people
Mayors of Omaha, Nebraska
Nebraska Republicans
Omaha City Council members
People from Wood River, Illinois
School board members in Nebraska
Seattle Pacific University alumni
Women mayors of places in Nebraska
Women city councillors in Nebraska